Dadzis ("bur") was a Latvian satire magazine which was launched in 1957. The magazine had its headquarters in Rīga. It frequently featured cartoons, humors, satirical articles about criticizing bureaucrats. However, it was a semi-official publication of the communist government. Māris Bišofs is among the former contributors of the magazine. It sold 76,400 copies in 1970. Dadzis folded in 1995.

References

1957 establishments in Latvia
1995 disestablishments in Latvia
Defunct magazines published in Latvia
Magazines established in 1957
Magazines disestablished in 1995
Mass media in Riga
Magazines published in the Soviet Union
Satirical magazines published in Europe
Communist magazines
Eastern Bloc mass media
Latvian-language magazines